The Bahamas competed at the 1988 Summer Olympics in Seoul, South Korea.

Competitors
The following is the list of number of competitors in the Games.

Athletics

Men
Track & road events

Field events

Women
Track & road events

Field events

Boxing

Men

Diving

Women

Sailing

Open

Swimming

Men

See also
Bahamas at the 1987 Pan American Games

References 

 sports-reference
 Official Olympic Reports

Nations at the 1988 Summer Olympics
1988
Olympics